Thirumayam taluk is a taluk of Pudukkottai district of the Indian state of Tamil Nadu. The headquarters of the taluk is the town of Thirumayam

Demographics
According to the 2011 census, the taluk of Thirumayam had a population of 158,860 with 79,049 males and 79,811 females. There were 1,010 women for every 1,000 men. The taluk had a literacy rate of 68.3%. Child population in the age group below 6 was 7,983 Males and 7,770 Females.

References 

Taluks of Pudukkottai district